There are at least two places called Alfredton:

Alfredton, Victoria in Australia
Alfredton, New Zealand

See also
Alfreton, Derbyshire, England
Alfredtown, New South Wales, Australia